The National Film Archive (abb. NFA) is a film archive located in Prague, Czech Republic. It was established in 1943 (From 1943 to 1945 known as Filmový archiv, from 1945 to 1989 Československý filmový ústav, then from 1990 to 1992 Český filmový archiv) and in 1946 it became a member of the International Federation of Film Archives. In 1997 it became a founding member of the Association of European Film Archives and Cinematheques, ACE (Association des Cinémathèques Européenes).

History
In the Czech Republic, the NFA is one of the major memory institutions; in addition to performing the archival role it manages Czech films and is engaged in scientific and publishing activities, exhibition and promotion of film heritage and support of contemporary Czech cinema. Since 2011, the NFA has been involved in major digitisation projects (Markéta Lazarová, The Firemen’s Ball, All My Compatriots, Closely Watched Trains, Voyage to the End of the Universe, Case for a Rookie Hangman, Adelheid and others.)

The NFA takes care of more than 150 million metres of film, more than 500,000 photos, over 30,000 posters, and 100,000 promotional materials. Archival collections and a film library serve professionals engaged in scientific research and are a source of information and materials for contemporary audio-visual production. In the years 1965-2008, the NFA preserved nearly 24 million metres of film copied from highly flammable stock.

Functions
The National Film Archive offers:
 Access to Czech or Czechoslovak film materials and special collections, including technical cooperation, e.g. researching materials relating to people and specific themes
 Voluntary deposits of existing or newly created cinematographic works, free deposits of reproductive and preservation material to permanent archival care
 Access to collections as part of school and educational screenings or other academic and scientific activities
 Professional consultations or expert cooperation on Czech and international projects in the field of preservation, processing, cataloguing, research, theory and history of film and film archiving
 Publishing house
 Film educational programmes
 Representation of Czech cinema in major markets and international festivals
 Disseminating information about funding options offered in the MEDIA financial programme.

See also 
 List of film archives
 Cinema of Czech Republic

References

External links 
 http://nfa.cz/en/

Archives in the Czech Republic
Film archives in Europe
Cinema of Prague